Tedd Josiah (born 1970) is a music producer from Kenya. He started as a musician, first briefly with the group Ebony Affair before forming a new group, Hart, in 1993.

Early life 
The group was disbanded in 1995 and Josiah joined Sync Sound Studios as a producer. In 1999 he left Sync Sound Studios and formed Audio Vault Studios. It was renamed to Blu Zebra in 2002.

He is credited for producing compilation albums called 'Kenyan, The First Chapter' and 'Kenyan, The Second Chapter'. The two albums featured Hardstone, Kalamashaka, Gidi Gidi Maji Maji, Necessary Noize, In-Tu, Jimmy Gathu, Maina Kageni, Pete Odera,  Ndarling P and Ugandan musician Kawesa

Josiah is also the founder of Kisima Awards, the premier annual musical awards held in Kenya. He was given producer of the year prize at the Kisima Awards in 2004, but he rejected it citing his position as an organiser of the awards. Next year he resigned from its organizing committee.

Tedd Josiah has worked with many of the most popular Kenyan performers like Poxi Presha, Suzzana Owiyo, Achieng' Abura, Abbi, and Didge among others.

Tedd Josiah has most recently produced for up and coming new artists such as Iddi Hemed, with hit song Usijali  and Pace Kenya with his song "Napata".

For the 2007 General elections, Josiah campaigned ODM and its presidential candidate Raila Odinga. During the post-election crisis Josiah felt his life threatened and moved to London 2008, ending his career as a music producer.

References 
Kenya Times, January 17, 2007:  Ted Josiah: Show B iz President (interview)

1970 births
Living people
Kenyan musicians
Kenyan record producers
Kisima Music Award winners